Fiston Kumbi Mukabidi, also known as Libengué, (born December 12, 1988) is a Congolese football player.

References

Living people
1988 births
Democratic Republic of the Congo footballers
Association football defenders
Kabuscorp S.C.P. players
21st-century Democratic Republic of the Congo people